Peru is a city in, and the county seat of, Miami County, Indiana, United States. The population was 11,417 at the 2010 census, making it the most populous city in Miami County. Peru is located along the Wabash River, which divides the city in two. Peru is part of the Kokomo-Peru Combined Statistical Area.

Residents usually pronounce the name of Peru like the name of the nation of Peru as it is commonly pronounced in American English.

History

On August 18, 1827, Joseph Holman bought land near the confluence of the Mississinewa and Wabash Rivers from Jean Baptiste "Pechewa" (Wildcat) Drouet de Richardville, the chief of the Miami Indians. The sale was approved on March 3, 1828, by President John Quincy Adams. On March 12, 1829, Holman had the land surveyed and laid out into the town of Miamisport.

Peru was founded in 1834 by William N. Hood, who had bought  of land from Miamisport's founder Joseph Holman five years earlier. By 1835, court was being held in Peru rather than Miamisport, and the name "Miamisport" quietly disappeared as Peru became the dominant community in the area. Frances Slocum was reunited with members of her family near Peru in 1837, after nearly sixty years of captivity among Native Americans.

Early in the 20th century, Peru was home to a pioneering automobile maker, Model Automobile Company; like many other early automobile manufacturers, Model did not survive.

In 1913, Peru suffered a massive flood, the worst of its time. Before the flood of 1913, Peru was a busy town, full of activity and jobs, with 15,000 inhabitants, 100 factories, a trolley service, railroads, a new hospital (Duke's), a circus (which employed 1000 people on the road), and a new concrete bridge (largest of its kind in the world at the time). The total loss for Peru was estimated at $3,000,000 (1913 figures). Many people died, as well as many of the circus animals.

Public enemy John Dillinger and his gang robbed the Peru police department armory on October 21, 1933.  They acquired one Thompson submachine gun, two Winchester rifles, two shotguns, four .38 revolvers and a half-dozen bulletproof vests.

On June 23, 1972, Martin J. McNally hijacked American Airlines Flight 119 while in flight from St. Louis to Tulsa. After receiving a ransom of $502,500 he jumped out of the back of the Boeing 727 in what was the ninth copycat hijacking in the style of D. B. Cooper. The entire ransom as well as a weapon were found near Peru. A fingerprint led to his arrest. The money was found in a  sealed canvas mail bag by local farmer Lowell Elliott while he was working in his soybean field. Another farmer, Ronald Miller, discovered a Spitfire submachine gun in his corn field when a blade hit it while applying liquid nitrogen fertilizer.

The movie Little Big Top, which starred Sid Haig, was shot and directed in the town of Peru by Peru native Ward Roberts who also wrote the movie. Scenes show the famous drive up to the "Mr. Weenie" restaurant and the Circus building.

The Brownell Block/Senger Dry Goods Company Building, James Omar Cole House, Miami County Courthouse, Peru High School Historic District, and Shirk-Edwards House are listed on the National Register of Historic Places.

Circuses
Peru was the winter headquarters for several famous circuses, including Ringling Brothers, Hagenbeck–Wallace, Buffalo Bill's Wild West Show, and others. The International Circus Hall of Fame is located in Peru. Annually during the third week of July, the Peru Amateur Circus holds performances for the whole week, ending with the Circus City Festival and Parade. All of the performers are amateurs, ranging in age from 7 to 21 years. Peru is also the home of the world's only remaining manufacturer of steam calliopes.

Mariya Rasputina, daughter of Grigori Rasputin, was mauled by a bear in Peru while working for the Hagenback-Wallace Circus, but survived.

Geography
Peru is located on the Wabash River.

Peru is the largest town or city in Miami County, and is the site of the tribal headquarters of the Miami Nation.
Peru's water treatment plant tested negative for PFC in September 2015.

Transportation
The business route of US Route 31 runs north–south through Peru. The business route of US Route 24 runs east–west through the town.

The town had been stop on Wabash Railroad trains between St. Louis and Detroit. The last train on that line was the Wabash Cannon Ball in 1971. The last Amtrak service was in 1986 when the Chicago–Cincinnati–New York City Cardinal was rerouted out of the town.

Peru Municipal Airport, operated by the city, is located approximately 5 miles to the northwest.

Demographics

2010 census
As of the 2010 census, there were 11,417 people, 4,791 households, and 2,961 families living in the city. The racial makeup of the city was 93.1% White, 2.5% African American, 1.3% Native American, 0.4% Asian, 0.4% from other races, and 2.3% from two or more races. Hispanic or Latino of any race were 2.4% of the population.

There were 4,791 households, of which 30.8% had children under the age of 18 living with them, 42.0% were married couples living together, 14.9% had a female householder with no husband present, 4.9% had a male householder with no wife present, and 38.2% were non-families. 33.0% of all households were made up of individuals, and 13.5% had someone living alone who was 65 years of age or older. The average household size was 2.36 and the average family size was 2.96.

The median age in the city was 39 years. 24.5% of residents were under the age of 18; 8.8% were between the ages of 18 and 24; 24.1% were from 25 to 44; 27% were from 45 to 64; and 15.6% were 65 years of age or older. The gender makeup of the city was 47.5% male and 52.5% female.

2000 census
As of the census of 2000, there were 12,994 people, 5,410 households, and 3,397 families living in the city. The racial makeup of the city was 92.71% White, 2.95% African American, 1.52% Native American, 0.43% Asian, 0.01% Pacific Islander, and 1.83% from two or more races. Hispanic or Latino of any race were 1.32% of the population.

There were 5,410 households, out of which 30.9% had children under the age of 18 living with them, 45.1% were married couples living together, 13.7% had a female householder with no husband present, and 37.2% were non-families. 32.8% of all households were made up of individuals, and 14.3% had someone living alone who was 65 years of age or older. The average household size was 2.34 and the average family size was 2.97.

In the city, the population was spread out, with 26.1% under the age of 18, 8.7% from 18 to 24, 27.9% from 25 to 44, 21.4% from 45 to 64, and 15.9% who were 65 years of age or older. The median age was 36 years. For every 100 females, there were 88.0 males. For every 100 females age 18 and over, there were 84.1 males.

The median income for a household in the city was $30,668, and the median income for a family was $39,440. Males had a median income of $31,631 versus $20,440 for females. The per capita income for the city was $17,497. About 9.5% of families and 11.8% of the population were below the poverty line, including 18.0% of those under age 18 and 5.9% of those age 65 or over.

Education
The city has a lending library, the Peru Public Library.

Notable people
 Mary Newbury Adams, suffragist and education advocate
 Richard Antrim, Medal of Honor recipient
 Alfred Bergman, former five sport letterman at Notre Dame who holds the NCAA kick return record and former second baseman for the Cleveland Indians.
 Arthur Bergman, football player and coach.
 Frank Fetter, economist
 Albert Fredrick Ottomar Germann (1886–1976) and Frank Erhart Emmanuel Germann (1887–1974), physical chemists.
 Emmett Kelly, circus clown, Ringling Brothers Circus, International Circus Hall of Fame, actor
 Kyle Macy, former Purdue player, University of Kentucky All-America and former NBA player, former Morehead State University head coach; was raised in Peru and graduated from Peru High School
 Keith O'Conner Murphy, singer and songwriter, member of the Rockabilly Hall of Fame; was born in Peru at what is now 31 Shields Avenue 
 Ole Olsen, comedian and member of Olsen and Johnson
 B. J. Penn, briefly served as United States Secretary of the Navy in 2009
 Cole Porter, songwriter; was born in Peru, and buried at Mt. Hope Cemetery
 Ralph Richeson, actor best known for his portrayal of Richardson, the eccentric cook, on Deadwood
 Emil Schram, president of New York Stock Exchange.
 G. David Thompson (1899–1965), investment banker, industrialist, and modern art collector
 Robert Edward Weaver, artist, professor emeritus Herron School of Art, Indianapolis
 Nancy Wilson-Pajic, artist Paris, France. Named Knight of the order of arts and letters by the French ministry of culture. 
 John Ross Woodring, newspaper editor
 Carol Lou Woodward, pianist

References

External links
 City of Peru, Indiana website

Cities in Indiana
Cities in Miami County, Indiana
Micropolitan areas of Indiana
County seats in Indiana
Populated places established in 1834
1834 establishments in Indiana